The 1969–70 Rugby Union County Championship was the 70th edition of England's premier rugby union club competition at the time.

Staffordshire won their first title after defeating Gloucestershire in the final.

Semi finals

Final

See also
 English rugby union system
 Rugby union in England

References

Rugby Union County Championship
County Championship (rugby union) seasons